The 1857 California gubernatorial election was held on September 2, 1857, to elect the governor of California.

Results

References

1857
California
gubernatorial
September 1857 events